U137 is a cinematic post-rock duo from Borås, Sweden, consisting of musicians Adam Törnblad and Oscar Gullbrandsen. Both artists were part of another post-rock band called Moonlit Sailor, signed to indie label Deep Elm Records. As U137, the Swedish duo styled their sound to be more cinematic in nature, following from earlier traditional rock-influenced work. Their debut album Dreamer On The Run was released by Deep Elm Records in 2013. 
On May 8, 2017, Törnblad died at the age of 27.

Dreamer On The Run (2013) 
U137's debut album was produced, recorded, mixed and mastered at the HAV Music Studio in Boras.

The album was released on August 20, 2013. The album has received generally positive reviews.

Band members 
Current members
 Oscar Gullbrandsen (guitar, bass, piano, strings, vocals)

Discography

Albums
 2013: Dreamer On the Run
 2019: Chapter Two
 2022: Imagination

Singles

 2020: "Have Hope" (from Imagination) b/w "Beyond the Horizon"

Compilations

Deep Elm Records
 2014: Sampler No. 12: Sometimes I See You In the Stars – "Watching the Storm" (from Dreamer On the Run)
 2016: Sampler No. 13: This Heart of Mine – "Pearl Lakes" (from Dreamer On the Run)
 2020: Sampler No. 14: Farewells – "What We Call Home" & "Adam Forever" (from Chapter Two)

External links
 https://u137music.com/ 
U137 Official Web Page

References 

Swedish rock music groups
Swedish post-rock groups
Musical groups established in 2013
2013 establishments in Sweden